Asura fuscalis is a moth of the family Erebidae. It is found in India.

References

fuscalis
Moths described in 1891
Moths of Asia